Villa Hidalgo (formerly, Paso de Sotos) is a town and municipality in the state of Jalisco in Mexico.

Villa Hidalgo gets its name in honor of Mexican hero Miguel Hidalgo y Costilla.

There is an annual celebration in Villa Hidalgo on the last Sunday in January including the week leading to it. It is in celebration of the Virgin of Guadalupe.

Approximately 45 minutes away from the state of Aguascalientes.

Municipalities of Jalisco